Glenn Foxcroft (born 22 January 1992) is a South African-born Namibian former first-class cricketer.

Foxcroft was born in South Africa at Pretoria, but represented Namibia Under-19 cricket team in December 2010. He made his debut in first-class cricket for the Namibian senior team against Free State in the 2010–11 CSA 3-Day Cup. He played a total of eight first-class matches for Namibia, spread across that edition of the 3-Day Cup and the 2011–12 edition. Playing as a batsman in the Namibian team, he scored 378 runs at an average of 31.50; he made three scores of over fifty, with a highest score of 87. In addition to playing first-class cricket for Namibia, Foxcroft also made three List A one-day appearances and a lone Twenty20 appearance, all in 2011.

References

External links

1992 births
Living people
Cricketers from Pretoria
South African emigrants to Namibia
Namibian cricketers